Huang Sijing (born 8 January 1996) is a Chinese basketball player. She represented China in the basketball competition at the 2016 Summer Olympics.

References

External links

Chinese women's basketball players
Basketball players at the 2016 Summer Olympics
Basketball players at the 2020 Summer Olympics
Olympic basketball players of China
1996 births
Living people
Power forwards (basketball)
Basketball players from Guangdong
Sportspeople from Meizhou
Guangdong Vermilion Birds players
Asian Games medalists in basketball
Basketball players at the 2018 Asian Games
Asian Games gold medalists for China
Medalists at the 2018 Asian Games